Cecilia Margareta Lindgren is Professor of Genomic Endocrinology & Metabolism in the Nuffield Department of Women's and Reproductive Health at the University of Oxford, where she is also Group Head at the Wellcome Centre for Human Genetics and a research fellow at St. Anne's College. She became director of the Big Data Institute at Oxford on 1 April 2021; she had previously been a senior group leader at the institute.

Education and career 
Lindgreen earned her Ph.D. from Lund University in 2002. After receiving her Ph.D. from Lund University, she conducted postdoctoral research at the Karolinska Institute before joining the faculty of Oxford.

Research 
Lindgren is known for her research on the genetics of obesity and other complex traits.

Awards and honors 
In 2013, Lindgren was the inaugural winner of the Leena Peltonen Prize for Excellence in Human Genetics, and the 30th Khwarizmi International Award in 2017. In 2018, the American Society of Human Genetics awarded Lindgren its mentorship award.

References

External links
Faculty page

Living people
Academics of the University of Oxford
Women geneticists
Lund University alumni
Human geneticists
Obesity researchers
Year of birth missing (living people)